KRPI (1550 AM) is a commercial AM radio station broadcasting a radio format serving the South Asians residing in Metro Vancouver.  It is licensed to Ferndale, Washington, and airs news, talk and Bollywood music.  KRPI is owned by BBC Broadcasting, Inc.,

Previously carried from 2004-2020 Sher-E-Punjab, 2001-2004 Radio Punjab, 1994-2001 Apna Sangeet. Formerly carried Baptist programming and Commonwealth Club of California.

By day, KRPI is powered at 50,000 watts, the maximum for commercial U.S. AM stations.  But at night, it reduces power to 10,000 watts to avoid interfering with other stations on 1550 AM.  It uses a directional antenna at all times, with a three-tower array, pointed at Vancouver.  The transmitter is on Imhoff Road in Ferndale, about 10 miles from the Canada–United States border.

History
The station signed on the air as KOQT on September 30, 1963.  It was a daytimer, powered at only 1,000 watts and required to go off the air at night.  Power was increased in 1976 to 10,000 watts day and night, using a directional antenna after sunset, from a new transmitter site. The call sign was switched to KNTR on August 13, 1984.

On October 22, 1998, the station changed its call sign to KCCF.  And on August 9, 2002, to the current KRPI. The station previously broadcast a Christian radio format.

Apna Sangeet was formed by Sukhdev Singh Dhillon in 1994. In 2001, Apna Sangeet became Radio Punjab International. In 2004, Radio Punjab accused rival Sher-E-Punjab of broadcasting on its AM 1550 frequency.  After legal struggles, Radio Punjab moved to a different AM frequency. Sher-E-Punjab took over Radio Punjab.

On May 24, 2012, KRPI received a construction permit from the Federal Communications Commission (FCC) to change its city of license from Ferndale, Washington to Point Roberts, Washington and to increase its nighttime power to 50,000 watts. This move was meant to improve reception in Metro Vancouver. The move to Point Roberts attracted concerns from residents of Point Roberts and the adjacent community of Tsawwassen, British Columbia, citing potential interference with electronic devices and health concerns.

See also
 Indo-Canadians in Greater Vancouver

References

External links
 KRPI

RPI
Indo-Canadian culture